This is a list of transfers in Serbian football for the 2014-15 winter transfer window.
Only moves featuring a Serbian SuperLiga side are listed.
The order by which the clubs are listed is equal to the classification at the mid-season of the 2014–15 Serbian SuperLiga.

Serbian SuperLiga

Partizan

In: 

Out:

Red Star Belgrade

In:

Out:

Vojvodina

In:

Out:

Čukarički

In:

Out:

Novi Pazar

In:

Out:

OFK Beograd

In:

Out:

Jagodina

In:

Out:

Mladost Lučani

In:

Out:

Spartak Subotica

In:

Out:

Rad

In:

Out:

Napredak

In:

Out:

Voždovac

In:

Out:

Donji Srem

In:

Out:

Borac Čačak

In:

Out:

Radnički Niš

In:

Out:

Radnički 1923

In:

Out:

See also
Serbian SuperLiga
2014–15 Serbian SuperLiga

References

External sources

Serbian SuperLiga
2014–15
transfers